Lake Tarawera is the largest of a series of lakes which surround the volcano Mount Tarawera in the North Island of New Zealand. Like the mountain, it lies within the Okataina caldera. Wahanga, Ruawahia, Tarawera and Koa.

Geography
The lake was substantially affected by the eruption of Mount Tarawera on 10 June 1886. The lake outlet was blocked for two decades and the lake level increased. The eruption killed over 150 people, and buried the Māori village of Te Wairoa on the southwest shore of the lake.

Also assumed destroyed were the famed Pink and White Terraces. However, in February 2011 a team mapping the lake floor discovered what appeared to be part of the Pink Terraces. Subsequently, a portion of the White Terraces was reportedly rediscovered in June 2011. The announcement of the rediscovery of the White Terraces coincided with the 125th anniversary of the eruption of Mt. Tarawera in 1886. It was thought that the rest of the terraces may be buried in sediment rather than having been destroyed.

More recent research questions these earlier findings and reports the Pink and White terrace spring sites instead lie on land (along with a lesser-known Black Terrace spring).

Tarawera means "Burnt Spear", named by a visiting hunter who left his bird spears in a hut and on returning the following season found both the spears and hut had been burned down completely.

The lake is filled primarily by water flowing through the volcanic rocks and ashes, only about 42% being from water flowing in streams, etc. The flows are estimated to be -

Lake Tarawera is home to eels and rainbow trout. During the summer it is popular for both fishing and water sports, and also camping as there a number of hot water beaches.

The main hot water sources are in the southern section of the lake at the Wairua Stream, Hot Water Beach and Te Puha and Tarawera fumaroles. There is also a small geothermal area at Humphrey's Bay, to the south of Lake Okataina.

Lake Tarawera's outflow is at its north east end, into the Tarawera River, which flows northeast into the Bay of Plenty.

Lake Tarawera township
Lake Tarawere township is part of the larger Kaingaroa-Whakarewarewa statistical area.

The township had a population of 267 at the 2018 New Zealand census, an increase of 60 people (29.0%) since the 2013 census, and a decrease of 3 people (−1.1%) since the 2006 census. There were 132 households, comprising 132 males and 135 females, giving a sex ratio of 0.98 males per female, with 30 people (11.2%) aged under 15 years, 33 (12.4%) aged 15 to 29, 126 (47.2%) aged 30 to 64, and 78 (29.2%) aged 65 or older.

Ethnicities were 91.0% European/Pākehā, 11.2% Māori, 2.2% Pacific peoples, 4.5% Asian, and 2.2% other ethnicities. People may identify with more than one ethnicity.

Although some people chose not to answer the census's question about religious affiliation, 59.6% had no religion, 32.6% were Christian and 1.1% had other religions.

Of those at least 15 years old, 69 (29.1%) people had a bachelor's or higher degree, and 27 (11.4%) people had no formal qualifications. 66 people (27.8%) earned over $70,000 compared to 17.2% nationally. The employment status of those at least 15 was that 114 (48.1%) people were employed full-time, 42 (17.7%) were part-time, and 3 (1.3%) were unemployed.

References

External links
 

Lakes of the Bay of Plenty Region
Okataina Volcanic Centre
Volcanic crater lakes
1886 eruption of Mount Tarawera